Oleg Balan (born 27 November 1969) is a Moldovan jurist and politician who served as Minister of Internal Affairs of Moldova between 18 February 2015 and 20 January 2016.

From December 2014 until 18 February 2015 Oleg Balan was a Member of Parliament of Moldova, before being appointed as Minister of Internal Affairs of Moldova in the Gaburici Cabinet, replacing Dorin Recean in office. He served as Minister of Interior also in the next cabinet led by Valeriu Streleț, until, after a political crisis, the Filip Cabinet was inaugurated on 20 January 2016.

Personal life
Oleg Balan is married and has two children. Aside Romanian he speaks Russian and French.

Publications
Oleg Balan is author or co-author of 84 works, researches and communiques scientific on his specialty:
Drept internațional public" (two volumes), 
Drept internațional umanitar",
Drept comunitar",
Drept internațional public" (2nd edition),
Drept international public" (3rd edition),
Terorismul - crima internațională", 
Terorism și antiterorism", 
Protecția drepturilor omului în conflictele armate".

References

1969 births
Living people
Moldovan Ministers of the Interior
Moldovan generals
Moldovan politicians
Babeș-Bolyai University alumni
People from Cantemir District